U.S. Route 20A may refer to:

U.S. Route 20A (New York)
U.S. Route 20A (Ohio)

20A
A
20A